Eos Airlines, Inc. was an American all-business class airline headquartered in Purchase, New York, with its flights from John F. Kennedy International Airport in New York. On 26 April 2008 Eos Airlines announced its plans to file bankruptcy on its web site, announcing it would cease passenger operations after April 27.

History
The airline was founded in 2004 by Dave Spurlock, a former director of strategy at British Airways. The company was initially named Atlantic Express and changed its name to Eos in 2005. Eos began operations between New York and London Stansted on October 18, 2005. With the launch of its magazine eosCLASS in London on 13 March 2008, eos dropped 'Airlines' from its name and altered its slogan to become "eos - Uncrowded. Uncompromising. UNAIRLINE." This change was unveiled by Adam Komack, Chief Lifestyle Officer.

Destinations
Eos Airlines operated a service between John F. Kennedy International Airport (JFK) and London Stansted Airport, with between two and four daily flights. On June 20, 2007, the airline stated that it ranked fourth amongst the most frequently scheduled airlines on the New York-London route.

In April 2007 the airline announced that routes from Stansted to Washington, D.C., Boston, Los Angeles, and two other destinations were set to begin within the next couple of years. It also had plans to begin flights from Miami to South America.

On October 18, 2007, Eos announced that it would begin flights from JFK to Paris, France, and from Newark International Airport to Stansted in 2008. The airline had not revealed details of the Paris flight except that it would have begun in the fall. The Stansted to Newark flights were to begin on May 5, 2008. Eos was also planning to begin flights from Stansted to Dubai on July 6, 2008.

According to the Eos website, the airline was planning on launching up to four new routes in 2008.

United Arab Emirates
Dubai (Dubai International Airport)
United Kingdom
London (London Stansted Airport)
United States
New York City (John F. Kennedy International Airport)
Newark (Newark Liberty International Airport)

Fleet
The Eos Airlines fleet consisted of the following aircraft as of April 2008:

6 Boeing 757-200

Fleet average age was 12.7 years.

The airline operated its Boeing 757s in a 48-seat all-business class configuration. The seats had a fold-out table and a seating arrangement that allowed passengers to sit face-to-face to hold business meetings or dine together.

The launch of eosCLASS magazine revealed that, had Eos remained in operation, it would have expanded its fleet to 8 planes, with two added at the end of 2007, and two to follow in 2008.

Awards
2007 Long-Haul Business Airline of the Year (2007 Business Travel World Awards)
World's Leading Business Class Only Airline 2007 - World Travel Awards
Most Punctual Airline between London and New York 2006 & 2007
Eos Seat: Product Design Award 2006

Last flights
The last scheduled flights flown by Eos Airlines were on April 28, 2008 Flight 6 (8:30pm) from JFK to STN and on April 28, 2008 Flights 3 (1:00pm) and 7 (6:30pm) from STN to JFK. The final flight was a charter, flight 9805, which departed STN on the evening of April 30, arriving at JFK a few minutes before midnight.

See also
 L'Avion
 Silverjet
 Maxjet
 List of defunct airlines of the United States

References

External links

 Eos Airlines (Archive)
 Eos Airlines Fleet Detail

Airlines established in 2004
Airlines disestablished in 2008
Companies based in Purchase, New York
Defunct airlines of the United States
Defunct companies based in New York (state)
Business class airlines